Frazee is a surname. Notable people with the surname include:

 Harry Frazee (1881–1929), American theatrical agent and producer, one-time owner of the Boston Red Sox baseball team who sold Babe Ruth to the New York Yankees.
 Jane Frazee, (1915-1985), American actress
 Jeff Frazee (b. 1987), American ice hockey goaltender
 Marla Frazee (b. 1958), American children's book author and illustrator.
 Robert C. Frazee (1928–2009), American politician
 Rowland Frazee (b. 1921), former CEO of the Royal Bank of Canada.
 Terry Frazee, special effects artist